The Wealden Group, occasionally also referred to as the Wealden Supergroup, is a group (a sequence of rock strata) in the lithostratigraphy of southern England. The Wealden group consists of paralic to continental (freshwater) facies sedimentary rocks of Berriasian to Aptian age and thus forms part of the English Lower Cretaceous. It is composed of alternating sands and clays. The sandy units were deposited in a flood plain of braided rivers, the clays mostly in a lagoonal coastal plain.

The Wealden Group can be found in almost all Early Cretaceous basins of England: its outcrops curve from the Wessex Basin in the south to the Cleveland Basin in the northeast. It is not found in northwest England and Wales, areas which were at the time tectonic highs where no deposition took place. The same is true for the London Platform around London and Essex. Offshore, the Wealden Group can reach a thickness of 700 metres. The terms Wealden and Wealden facies are also used as generic terms referring to Early Cretaceous non-marine sequences elsewhere in Europe.

Stratigraphy
The Wealden Group lies stratigraphically on top of the Purbeck Group, which spans the Jurassic-Cretaceous boundary. Within the Wessex Basin, the Wealden Group consists of two formations: the Wessex Formation and overlying Vectis Formation. In the Weald Basin, the Wealden Group consists of four formations: the Ashdown Formation, the Wadhurst Clay Formation, the Tunbridge Wells Sand Formation and the Weald Clay Formation. The lower three formations are sometimes collectively referred to as the Hastings Beds. In Oxfordshire, Buckinghamshire and Wiltshire, the Wealden Group is only found as an outlier on top of hills and only consists of a single formation, the Whitchurch Sand Formation. In Yorkshire, the equivalently aged Speeton Clay Formation, a marine unit, is present.

On top of the Wealden Group is the Lower Greensand Group. The difference between these two groups has been formed by a major eustatic (global) transgression of the sea. The Greensand (Aptian/Albian in age) consists of marine deposits.

The sequence in the Weald Basin has also been described as a supergroup, containing the Weald Clay Group and Hastings Group.

Palaeontology
The Wealden Group forms outcrops covering a large part of south and south-eastern England including the Isle of Wight. It takes its name from the Weald region of Kent, Sussex, Surrey and Hampshire. It has yielded many fossils, including dinosaurs like Iguanodon and Hypsilophodon. Apart from fossils, it shows many other signs of being deposited in a continental environment, such as mudcracks and -in some rare cases- dinosaur footprints. Taxa included in the table below have an uncertain provenance and cannot be placed into one of the constituent formations, thus they are placed here.

Pterosaurs

Dinosaurs

Wealden elsewhere in Europe 
The term "Wealden" and "Wealden facies" has been applied to other Lower Cretaceous sequences in Europe, including the "German Wealden", comprising the Berriasian aged Bückeberg Formation of the Lower Saxony Basin and in Belgium, where "Wealden facies" has been used as a term to refer to the Barremian-Aptian aged sequences of the Mons Basin, including the Sainte-Barbe Clays Formation where large numbers of Iguanodon were found in the 19th century.

References

Further reading

See also 
 List of dinosaur-bearing rock formations

Geological groups of the United Kingdom
Geologic formations of England
Lithostratigraphy of England
Lower Cretaceous Series of Europe
Cretaceous England
Berriasian Stage
Valanginian Stage
Hauterivian Stage
Barremian Stage
Aptian Stage
Shale formations
Sandstone formations